Black Bandit is a 1938 American Western film written and directed by George Waggner. The film stars Bob Baker, Marjorie Reynolds, Wally Wales, Jack Rockwell, Forrest Taylor and Glenn Strange. The film was released on September 16, 1938, by Universal Pictures.

Plot
Bob and Don Ramsay are twin brothers in opposite sides of the law since Bob is the Sheriff and Don is an outlaw that goes by the name Black Bandit, one time the Black Bandit strikes and is seen, but the blame goes to his identical brother Bob.

Cast        
Bob Baker as Sheriff Bob Ramsay / Don Ramsay
Marjorie Reynolds as Jane Allen
Wally Wales as Weepy
Jack Rockwell as Boyd Allen
Forrest Taylor as Sheriff Robert Warner
Glenn Strange as Luke Johnson
Arthur Van Slyke as Dad Ramsay
Carleton Young as Cash 
Dick Dickinson as Clint Evans
Schuyler Standish as Bob Ramsay 
Rex Downing as Young Don

References

External links
 

1938 films
American Western (genre) films
1938 Western (genre) films
Universal Pictures films
Films directed by George Waggner
American black-and-white films
1930s English-language films
1930s American films